Bowli is a Carnatic raga (also spelled as Bauli or Bhauli).  This raga is a janya of the 15th Melakarta raga Mayamalavagowla. This raga is known to be a morning raga.

Structure and Lakshana 

This ragam is an asymmetric scale and is classified as an audava-shadava ragam (five notes in the ascending scale and six notes in the descending scale).

: 
: 

The notes in this scale are shuddha rishabham, antara gandharam, panchamam and shuddha dhaivatam in arohana and additional kakali nishadham in avarohanam.

Select compositions

Kritis 
Sriman Narayana in Adi talam composed by Annamacharya,
Melukovayya in Jhampa talam composed by Tyagaraja, an utsava sampradaya kriti is well known in this raga.
Tappulanniyu in Rupakam composed by Muthiah Bhagavatar
Parvati Nayaka in Adi talam composed by Swati Tirunal
Elu narayanane in Khanda chapu talam by Kanakadasa in Kannada
Elu Hanumantha in Mishra Nadai adi by Purandara Dasaru
Karunanidhiye thaye in Misra Chapu composed by Papanasam Sivan
Tandanene Ahi in Adi talam composed by Annamacharya
Sri Parvati Parameshvarau in Adi Talam composed by Muthuswami Dikshitar

Film Songs

Language:Tamil

Related rāgams 
This section covers the theoretical and scientific aspect of this rāgam.

Scale similarities 
Revagupti is a rāgam which has a symmetrical scale matching the ascending scale of Bowli (nishadham is entirely omitted). Its  structure is :

Notes

References 

Janya ragas